The Historic Tramway of Grenoble was a  urban and suburban electric tramway network from the Grenoble region of France, created in 1894 and operated by the société grenobloise de tramways électriques, which has today entirely disappeared. At this time of industrial and demographic growth, the old Hippomobile modes of transportation, fiacres and horsebus, established since the end of the 18th century, were no longer sufficient to ensure smooth transport in cities. The urban and suburban lines developed continuously until the 1920s. With the rise of the bus, the trolleybus and the private car, ridership and profits declined and the tramways were replaced by buses. The last line was closed in 1952 after 52 years of service, and the current tramway of Grenoble was only launched 35 years later in 1987.

See also 
 Grenoble tramway
 Trams in France
 List of town tramway systems in France

 
Transport in Grenoble
Tram transport in France
Grenoble